Florin Ionuţ Ilie (born 18 June 1992) is a Romanian footballer who plays as a centre-back for Liga I club Universitatea Cluj.

Honours
Politehnica Timișoara
Liga II: 2011–12

UTA Arad
Liga II: 2019–20

References

External links
 
 

1992 births
Living people
Sportspeople from Alba Iulia
Romanian footballers
Romania youth international footballers
Romania under-21 international footballers
Association football defenders
CSM Unirea Alba Iulia players
Liga I players
Liga II players
FC Politehnica Timișoara players
CS Concordia Chiajna players
CSM Corona Brașov footballers
CS Gaz Metan Mediaș players
CS Minaur Baia Mare (football) players
CS Luceafărul Oradea players
CS Pandurii Târgu Jiu players
ASA 2013 Târgu Mureș players
CS Mioveni players
CS Sportul Snagov players
FC UTA Arad players
FC Universitatea Cluj players